The Upper and Lower Eissee are two lakes in the Dachstein Mountains in the Austrian state of Upper Austria.

Lower Eissee 
It was left behind by the melting of the Hallstätter Glacier that, until the middle of the 19th century, still extended as far as the doline of the upper Taubenkar. When the glacier retreated (today its snout lies at about 2,200 m), the Lower Eissee was left behind in the basin, because the moraine gravel is lined with limestone silt. For a long time after it had been formed, roughly to the turn of the century, large fields of dead ice could be found on its shores, but today they have disappeared. The Lower Eissee has neither aboveground headwaters nor tailwaters.

Upper Eissee 
The Upper Eissee (Oberer Eissee) lies about 700 metres west of the Lower Eissee at a height of some 2,100 m below the Simony Hut and the Dachstein Chapel. It was formed by the continued retreat of the glacier during the 20th century. In 1921 the ice had retreated so far that a small lake formed at its foot. This rapidly grew in size as a result of further melting until it measured about 100 x 50 metres (330 x 165 ft) and was up to 10 metres (33 ft) deep, but subsequently shrank again to only a fifth of this size due to the climate conditions. Since then the ice has retreated well away from the lakeshore. The Upper Eissee has now split into three smaller lakes as a result of silting up.

References 

Dachstein Mountains
Lakes of Upper Austria